Hands On Children's Museum is a children's museum in Olympia, Washington, USA.  It was founded in 1987 and received over 150,000 visitors a year at its old location near the Washington State Capitol. After moving to its new, permanent home on Olympia's East Bay, at 414 Jefferson Street on Olympia's East Bay, visitorship grew to over 300,000 in its first year (Nov 2012-Nov 2013).

The New Hands On Children's Museum, geared for children ages 0–11, features 8 themed galleries focusing on science and nature, plus an enhanced Arts & Parts Studio. The galleries include: "Good For You!" (healthy eating and living); "Our Puget Sound;" "Emergency!;" "Our Fabulous Forest;" "Move It!;" "Build It!;" "Snug Harbor" (for ages 0–4); and the two-story "Tides-to-Trees Climber and Stream Slide." The half-acre Outdoor Discovery Center was chosen by the Association of Children's Museums as one of only three "Going Wild!" pilot sites to demonstrate innovative ways to connect kids with nature; it is the only one of its kind in Washington. Opened in late Summer 2013, the Outdoor Discovery Center includes a Beach, Driftwood Forts, Mud Pie Pit, an interactive Stickworks sculpture "Raccoon Run," and a Fire Pit/Storytelling Ring. Once complete, the Outdoor Discovery Center will also feature a Hike-and-Trike Loop (summer of 2014), Children's Garden with edibles and flowers (summer of 2014), Compost and Worm bins (summer of 2014), an educational Rain Garden (summer of 2014), a Naturalist Cabin for holding nature workshops (summer of 2014), a ride-up Ferry (TBD), a Lighthouse (TBD), and much more. Check their website for the most updated exhibit plans: www.hocm.org.

Founded on the belief that all children deserve respect and the opportunity to learn, regardless of their ability to pay, the Museum offers a robust and award-winning Access Program for underserved and at-risk families. Access Programs served 86,000 children, families and educators in 2013, which represented a 37% increase since 2012. Programs include free monthly parenting classes, a free weekly preschool enrichment program, Free Friday Nights every month, and a library partnership to "check out" family admission passes. The Museum also offers discounted military admission and memberships, free field trips for rural, Title I and underserved elementary schools, and several family support programs. Its signature event Sand in the City is the second largest event in the region, offering free art and science activities for 35,000 children and families every year since 2000.

In 2013, Hands On was received the #4 spot in King5's Best "Fun Place to Take Kids" in Western Washington, and the Museum received the Best of South Sound's "Best Museum" and "Best Family Entertainment" Awards. The Museum is the first children's museum to receive a three Green Globes certification for green building and LEED certification.

References

External links

Children's museums in Washington (state)
Buildings and structures in Olympia, Washington
Museums in Thurston County, Washington